Michael Chene Donnelly (born October 10, 1963) is an American former ice hockey left wing. He played in the National Hockey League between 1986 and 1996 with the New York Rangers, Buffalo Sabres, Los Angeles Kings, Dallas Stars, and New York Islanders.

In his NHL career, Donnelly appeared in 465 games. He scored 114 goals and added 121 assists.  He is currently part of the player development department for the Kings.

In 1986, while playing for Michigan State University, Mike set the CCHA single season goals record with 59 goals (only Phil Latreille has scored more goals in a season in NCAA history), and that same year scored a total of 97 points which placed him 18th on the all-time points list for single season. He was named as the Most Outstanding Player of the 1986 NCAA Division I Men's Ice Hockey Tournament, which was won by Michigan State.

Career statistics

Awards and honors

References

External links
 

1963 births
Living people
AHCA Division I men's ice hockey All-Americans
American men's ice hockey left wingers
Buffalo Sabres players
Colorado Rangers players
Dallas Stars players
Detroit Vipers players
Ice hockey coaches from Michigan
Ice hockey players from Michigan
Kalamazoo Wings (1974–2000) players
Long Beach Ice Dogs (IHL) players
Los Angeles Kings coaches
Los Angeles Kings players
Los Angeles Kings scouts
Michigan State Spartans men's ice hockey players
NCAA men's ice hockey national champions
New Haven Nighthawks players
New York Islanders players
New York Rangers players
Rochester Americans players
SC Bern players
Sportspeople from Livonia, Michigan
Undrafted National Hockey League players
Utah Grizzlies (IHL) players